The second season of the Brazilian competitive reality television series MasterChef Junior premiered on December 20, 2022, at 10:30 p.m. on Band.

Ana Paula Padrão returned as the host, while Érick Jacquin and Henrique Fogaça returned as judges. Paola Carosella left the show after first season and was replaced by Helena Rizzo.

The grand prize was R$15.000 and the MasterChef Junior trophy.

Larissa Krokoscz won the competition over Lucas Martins on December 29, 2022.

Contestants

Top 8

Elimination table

Key

Ratings and reception

Brazilian ratings

All numbers are in points and provided by Kantar Ibope Media.

References

External links
 MasterChef Junior on Band.com
 

2022 Brazilian television seasons
MasterChef Junior 2